Jorge Godoy Cárdenas (born 25 May 1954) is a Mexican politician affiliated with the Citizens' Movement. As of 2014 he served as Deputy of the LX Legislature of the Mexican Congress representing the State of Mexico.

References

1954 births
Living people
Politicians from the State of Mexico
Citizens' Movement (Mexico) politicians
21st-century Mexican politicians
Deputies of the LX Legislature of Mexico
Members of the Chamber of Deputies (Mexico) for the State of Mexico